María Uriarte is an ecologist who specializes in the processes that drive tropical forest dynamics, especially after extreme weather events. She is currently a professor in the Department of Ecology, Evolution, and Environmental Science at Columbia University and serves as adjunct faculty in the Department of Ecology at the University of São Paulo, Brazil.  She conducts research primarily in Puerto Rico and Brazil and is associated with the Next Generation Ecosystem Experiments (NGEE) tropics and ForestGeo research groups.

Education and career 
Uriarte joined the Peace Corps in The Gambia, West Africa in 1989, where she worked with women's agricultural cooperatives in vegetation production improvement. She earned her M.S. in Environmental Studies from Yale School of Forestry and her Ph.D. in Ecology from Cornell University. She did her postdoctoral work at the Cary Institute of Ecosystem Studies, where she studied how forest recover from hurricane disturbances by developing different statistical tools.

Research 
Several of Uriarte's projects have been featured in population media outlets, such as The New York Times, PBS and CNN. Much of the covered work on these and other media outlets surrounds the effects of Hurricane Maria on Puerto Rican forest dynamics, and highlights the potential for stronger hurricanes to have adverse effects on forests and accelerate climate change. Other highlighted work included projects that use Artificial Intelligence to identify tropical tree species using aerial photos collected by NASA in El Yunque National Forest, Puerto Rico.

Honors and awards 
María Uriarte received the Leopold Leadership Fellowship from the Woods Institute for the Environment, Stanford University and a Science without Borders Fellowship from the Brazilian government.

External links 
 Faculty page
 Uriarte lab website

References 

Living people
Women ecologists
Columbia University faculty
Academic staff of the University of São Paulo
Forests
Yale School of Forestry & Environmental Studies alumni
Cornell University alumni
Hurricane Maria
Year of birth missing (living people)